Count John Ernest of Nassau-Siegen (8 November 1618Jul. – 23 November 1639), official titles: Graf zu Nassau, Katzenelnbogen, Vianden und Diez, Herr zu Beilstein, was a count from the House of Nassau-Siegen, a cadet branch of the Ottonian Line of the House of Nassau. He served as a naval officer in the Dutch West India Company.

Biography
He was baptised in Siegen on 10 January 1619Jul. and was named after his eldest halfbrother John Ernest, who died the previous year.

The will and testament of Count John VII ‘the Middle’ of 1621 bequeathed John Maurice and his younger brothers from their father’s second marriage the district of Freudenberg, some villages in the Haingericht and a third part of the administration of the city of Siegen.

John Ernest enlisted in the Dutch States Army under Prince Frederick Henry of Orange. He accompanied his eldest brother John Maurice to Dutch Brazil and served as a naval officer on the ‘Alkmaar’. He died of dysentery in São Salvador da Bahia de Todos os Santos on 23 November 1639 aboard the ‘Alkmaar’, and was buried in the Calvinist church in Mauritsstad on 1 December.

The first stronghold built by the Dutch in Mauritsstad was named Fortress Ernestus after him.

Ancestors

Notes

References

Sources
 
 
  (1911). "Johan Ernst II". In:  en  (redactie), Nieuw Nederlandsch Biografisch Woordenboek (in Dutch). Vol. Eerste deel. Leiden: A.W. Sijthoff. p. 1222.
 
 
 
 
 
 
 
 
 
 
 
  (1979). "Genealogische gegevens". In:  (red.), Nassau en Oranje in de Nederlandse geschiedenis (in Dutch). Alphen aan den Rijn: A.W. Sijthoff. p. 40–44, 224–228. .
 
 
  (1882). Het vorstenhuis Oranje-Nassau. Van de vroegste tijden tot heden (in Dutch). Leiden: A.W. Sijthoff/Utrecht: J.L. Beijers.

External links

 Nassau. In: Medieval Lands. A prosopography of medieval European noble and royal families, compiled by Charles Cawley.
 Nassau Part 5. In: An Online Gotha, by Paul Theroff.

1618 births
1639 deaths
Dutch West India Company people
German Calvinist and Reformed Christians
German military officers
German people of the Eighty Years' War
John Ernest of Nassau-Siegen
Military personnel of the Eighty Years' War
Military personnel from Siegen
People of Dutch Brazil
17th-century German people